Oluf Skarpnes (26 December 1932 - 29 December 2019) was a Norwegian jurist and public servant.

He was born in Smøla. Holding the cand.jur. degree, he was appointed in the Norwegian Ministry of Justice in 1963. In 1980 he became deputy under-secretary of state. From 1982 to 1998 he was the County Governor of Vest-Agder county.  He was also the chair of the Skarpnes commission. He died on 29 December 2019 in Bærum, Norway.

References

1932 births
2019 deaths
County governors of Norway
Norwegian jurists
Norwegian civil servants